2QN is a radio station based in Deniliquin, New South Wales, Australia. It broadcasts on the medium wave radio band, at a frequency of 1521 kHz.

2QN combines a 'Hits & Memories' music format with talk radio and news.

The station's breakfast former announcer, Paul Dix, was the longest serving breakfast announcer in Australia at the one station. He had over 50 years experience in radio and has been in Deniliquin since 1961. Paul died in 2013.

The studios were destroyed by fire in 1939.

In the mid-1940s the station was under threat of being relocated to Wangaratta, which caused protests in Deniliquin.

The station is located in George Street, Deniliquin, in a purpose-built building.

Main programs
Morning Rush with Sean Cullen
Mornings with Neil Mitchell
Country Today – Rural News and interviews with Libby Price
Sportsday
Nights with Denis Walter

References

External links
 2QN website

Radio stations in New South Wales
Radio stations established in 1935
Classic hits radio stations in Australia
Ace Radio